Anima nera (Black Soul) is a 1962 Italian drama film directed by Roberto Rossellini. It is based on the stage play with the same name written by Giuseppe Patroni Griffi.

Cast 
 Vittorio Gassman: Adriano Zucchelli
 Nadja Tiller: Mimosa
 Annette Stroyberg: Marcella 
 Yvonne Sanson: Olga Manfredi
 Tony Brown: Guidino 
 Rina Braido: Lucia 
 Eleonora Rossi Drago: Alessandra

References

External links

  

1962 films
Italian drama films
1962 drama films
Films directed by Roberto Rossellini
Italian films based on plays
1960s Italian films